Anna Maria of Ostfriesland (23 June 1601 – 15 February 1634) was a German noblewoman.

She was a daughter of Count Enno III of East Frisia and Anna of Holstein-Gottorp. Her paternal grandmother was Katharina of Sweden, a daughter of Gustav I of Sweden and his second wife Margareta Leijonhufvud.

On 4 September 1622 she married Adolf Frederick I, Duke of Mecklenburg-Schwerin (1588–1658).  They had the following children:

 Christian Louis I, Duke of Mecklenburg-Schwerin (11 December 1623 – 21 June 1692)
 Sophia Agnes of Mecklenburg-Schwerin (11 January 1625 – 26 December 1694)
 Karl, Duke of Mecklenburg-Mirow (8 March 1626 – 20 August 1670)
 Anna Maria of Mecklenburg-Schwerin (1 July 1627 – 11 December 1669), married Augustus, Duke of Saxe-Weissenfels (ancestors of George III of the United Kingdom).
 Johann Georg of Mecklenburg-Schwerin (5 May 1629 – 9 July 1675)
 Hedwig of Mecklenburg-Schwerin (11 August 1630 – 17 May 1631)
 Gustav Rudolf of Mecklenburg-Schwerin (26 February 1632 – 14 May 1670)
 Juliane of Mecklenburg-Schwerin (8 November 1633 – 3 February 1634)

Ancestry

References

1601 births
1634 deaths
House of Mecklenburg-Schwerin
Duchesses of Mecklenburg-Schwerin
House of Cirksena